Principessa Jolanda may refer to -

People
Princess Yolanda of Savoy (1901-85)

Ships
, a number of ships with this name